= EDUfair =

International Educational Fair

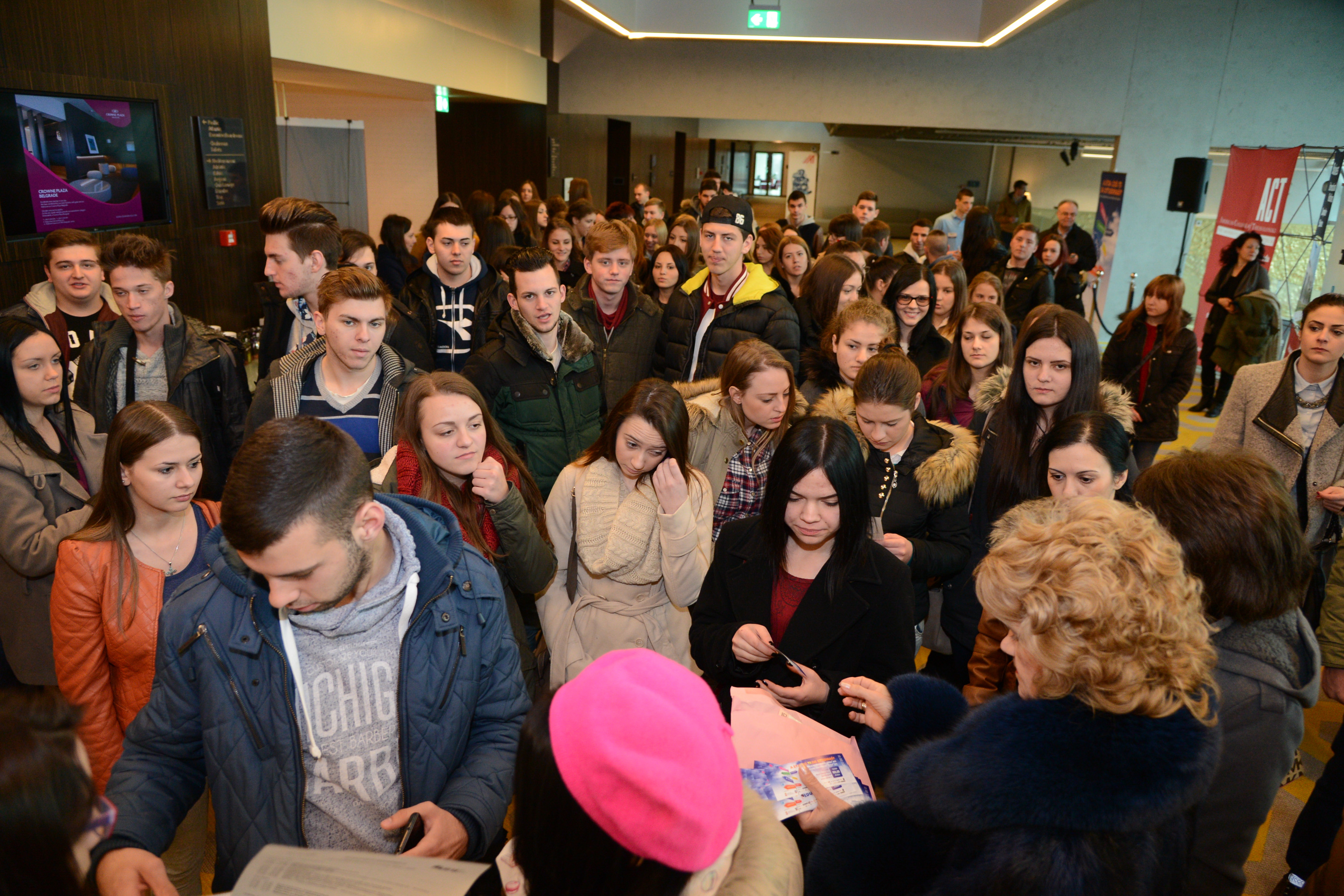

EDUfair is the largest international educational fair in Serbia, held in Belgrade every year. It enables youths from Serbia and the region to acquire all the essential information about studying programs since 2004. EDUfair gathers variety of different universities, faculties and other study program facilities from all over Serbia (Beograd, Novi Sad, Niš, Kragujevac, etc.) and from abroad (Austria, Australia, Greece, Canada, Hungary, Italy, Germany, United States, Great Britain, France, Croatia, Czech Republic, Slovenia, Switzerland, etc.). Exhibitors at EDUfair present new accredited academic and professional programs and offer scholarships and job opportunities after graduation.

== History ==
EDUfair was established in 2004 because until that time there was a lack of information available about higher education in Serbia. It was the first event where future freshmen and future master's students could learn about different Serbian and foreign study programs at one place. According to the statistics, EDUfair gathered over 65,000 visitors during the last 14 years.

== Mission ==
Assisting students to find a study program and to make a choice regarding their future career by enabling them to acquire information in one place

== Advertising and promotion ==
Over the years, EDUfair was mainly promoted through newspaper articles, billboards and banners. During the last 5 years, it has been implementing social media advertising, as it provides easier and more effective approach towards students. Throughout its advertising program, EDUfair heavily uses the slogan “So what are you going to study?”.

== Programs and workshops ==
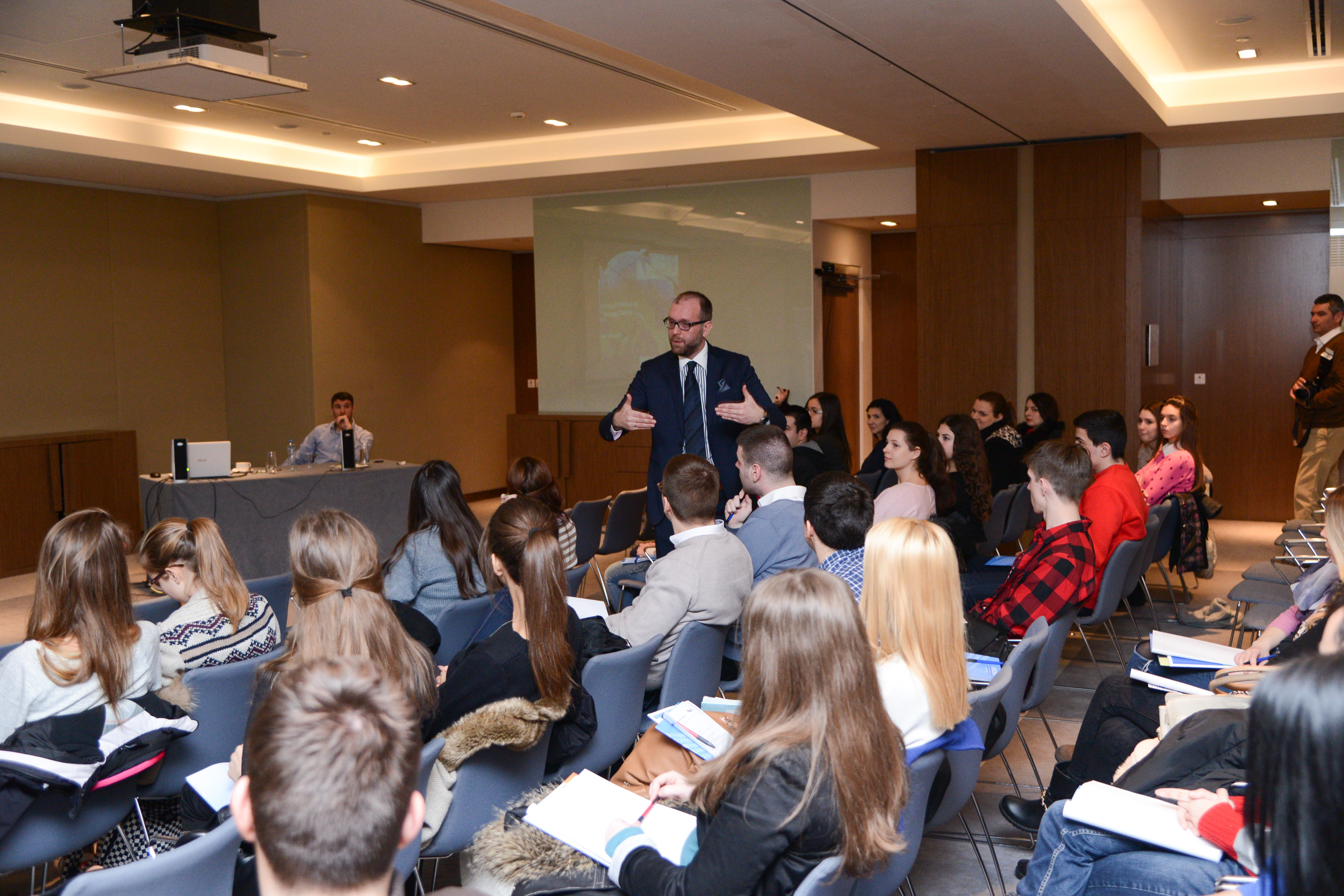

Beside exhibitor booths, visitors can attend accredited academic and professional seminars, workshops, and programs offered to both students and lecturers. Through these, students can learn about various Serbian and foreign study programs, scholarships and job opportunities after graduation. On the other hand, lecturers can acquire valuable skills and knowledge for their further professional improvement.
